Scott Hecker is a sound editor who has nearly 100 films to date. He was nominated at the 75th Academy Awards for the film Road to Perdition in the category of Best Sound Editing.

He has won four times at the Motion Picture Sound Editors awards.

He also was nominated for an Emmy Award for the sound on Miami Vice.

References

External links

Sound editors
Living people
Year of birth missing (living people)